Baccharis neglecta (also known as false willow, jara dulce, poverty weed, New Deal weed, and Roosevelt weed) is a species of perennial plant in the family Asteraceae. It is native to northern Mexico (Chihuahua, Coahuila, Nuevo León, San Luis Potosí, Tamaulipas)  and the south-western and south-central United States (Arizona, New Mexico, Oklahoma, and Texas).

Male and female flowers grow separate plants. Females are distinctive in that the flowers consist of small silky, greenish white heads. Silky plumes start blooming in October and November.

References

External links
Texas A&M University, Texas Native Plants, Roosevelt Weed, Poverty Weed, False-willow, New Deal Weed, Jara Dulce Baccharis neglecta 
Excerpts from Jim Conrad's Naturalist Newsletter

neglecta
Flora of North America
Plants described in 1898